The 2012–13 Texas Longhorns men's basketball team represented the University of Texas at Austin in the 2012–13 NCAA Division I men's basketball season. Their head coach was Rick Barnes, who was in his 15th year. The team played its home games at the Frank Erwin Center in Austin, Texas and were members of the Big 12 Conference. They finished the season 16–18, 7–11 in Big 12 play to finish in seventh place. They lost in the quarterfinals of the Big 12 tournament to Kansas State. Texas received an invitation to the 2013 College Basketball Invitational and became the first Big 12 team to participate in the postseason tournament's six-year history. The Longhorns lost in the first round to former Southwest Conference rival Houston.

Before the Season

Departures

Recruiting

Schedule

Source:

|-
!colspan=9 style="background:#CC5500; color:white;"| Non-Conference Regular Season

|-
!colspan=9 style="background:#CC5500; color:white;"| Big 12 Regular Season

 

|-
!colspan=9 style="background:#CC5500; color:white;"| 2013 Big 12 men's basketball tournament
|-

|-

|-
!colspan=9 style="background:#CC5500; color:white;"| 2013 College Basketball Invitational
|-

Roster

References

Texas
Texas Longhorns men's basketball seasons
Texas
Texas Longhorns men's b
Texas Longhorns men's b